Florence E. MacDonald (October 28, 1909 – May 6, 2008) was an American middle-distance runner. She competed at the 1928 Olympics in the 800 m event and finished in sixth place, setting a new national record at 2:22.6.

MacDonald was born to Angus R. and Mary (Currie) MacDonald and had two sisters, Christina E. MacDonald and Margaret Janowicz. She married Peter Campbell and gave birth to a daughter, June Marie Russo, and a son, John Scott Campbell. For 25 years she worked as a nurse at a school of medicine.

References

https://www.novascotiagenealogy.com/ItemView.aspx?ImageFile=1909-58200896&Event=birth&ID=237627

1909 births
2008 deaths
Sportspeople from the Cape Breton Regional Municipality
People from Sydney, Nova Scotia
Canadian emigrants to the United States
Athletes (track and field) at the 1928 Summer Olympics
Olympic track and field athletes of the United States
American female middle-distance runners
20th-century American women
20th-century American people
21st-century American women